Anna Glinskaya (died c. 1553), née Ana Jakšić was a Serbian and Russian noblewoman. She was daughter of Serbian voivode Stefan Jakšić (d. 1489), from the Jakšić noble family. Her sister Jelena Jakšić (d. after 1529) was titular Despotissa of Serbia. Anna was married to prince Vasili Lvovich Glinsky (d. 1515), brother of powerful prince Michael Lvovich Glinsky (d. 1534). Anna and Vasili had several children, including princes Yuri Vasilyevich Glinsky (d. 1547) and Michael Vasilyevich Glinsky (d. 1559). Anna′s and Vasili′s daughter was Elena Glinskaya (d. 1538) who married grand prince Vasili III of Russia (d. 1533). Through her, Anna was grandmother of Tsar Ivan the Terrible (d. 1584).

Regency and aftermath

During the regency of her daughter Elena Glinskaya from 1533 until 1538, Anna is said to have wielded influence over affairs of the Russian state. After the death of her daughter, Ana and her sons, uncles of young tsar Ivan, were removed from influence. When her grandson Ivan IV was declared of age and the regency terminated, Ana and her sons returned to favor, securing influence over him during his early reign. They actively participated in the coronation of Ivan (1547). Tsar granted them a principality and allowed for a reprisal of their former opponents, which were carried out "on the orders of Prince Michael Glinski and his mother Anna" rather than the Tsar himself.

The influence of Anna and her sons created public hatred toward them, and when a fire destroyed large parts of Moscow in June 1547, the public demanded that Ana be turned over to them, and accused her of being a sorceress who had stolen the hearts of people and then flew over the city and sprinkled it with the water from the hearts, causing the fire. Anna and her son Michael were forced to flee and hide, while Anna′s other son Yuri was killed by rioters. This incidents destroyed their power base, but despite of that, they returned to court and their former position of influence. When they appeared in public to attend the wedding of Ivan's brother Yurii, the court nobility protested and convinced the Tsar to remove his grandmother and uncle from the court. After that, their influence has finally declined.

See also
 Grand Principality of Moscow
 Tsardom of Russia
 Russia–Serbia relations

References

Sources

Extern links
The Noble House of Jaksic (RTS Documentary - Official Channel)
The Historical Role of the Female Descendats of the Jaksic Brothers (RTS Documentary - Official Channel)
Ana Jaksic and Elena Glinskaya (RTS Documentary - Official Channel) 
Ana Jaksic and Ivan the Terrible (RTS Documentary - Official Channel) 
16th-century Russian people
16th-century Russian women
16th-century Serbian nobility
16th-century Serbian women
1553 deaths